The 2003 Betta Electrical Sandown 500 was an endurance race for V8 Supercars. The event was staged at the Sandown International Raceway near Melbourne in Victoria, Australia on 14 September 2003 as Round 9 of the 2003 V8 Supercar Championship Series. The programmed race distance was 161 laps of the 3.1 km circuit (499 km) however the race was declared at 141 laps (437 km) due to the effects of the weather and a 19-minute delayed start due to a support category incident. It was the 36th Sandown 500 endurance race.

The race was won by Mark Skaife and Todd Kelly driving a  Holden VY Commodore.

Top 10 Shootout

Race results

+ Mark Porter did not drive car 021 during the race and Tim Leahey did not drive car 3 during the race.

Statistics
 Provisional Pole Position - #65 Paul Radisich - 1:11.0674
 Pole Position - #4 Marcos Ambrose - 1:11.8554
 Fastest Lap - #1 Mark Skaife - 1:12.0236
 Race Average Speed - 127 km/h

References

External links
 Race results, natsoft.com, as archived at web.archive.org

Motorsport at Sandown
Betta Electrical Sandown 500
Pre-Bathurst 500